Beaver Creek Bridge is located northwest of Ogden, Iowa, United States. The Marsh arch bridge was designed by Des Moines engineer James B. Marsh, and built by the N.E. Marsh & Son Construction Company of Des Moines in 1919. After it was completed it carried traffic on the Lincoln Highway. The bridge was listed on the National Register of Historic Places in 1998.

References

Bridges completed in 1919
Bridges in Boone County, Iowa
Arch bridges in Iowa
Road bridges on the National Register of Historic Places in Iowa
National Register of Historic Places in Boone County, Iowa
Lincoln Highway
Through arch bridges in the United States